Rat Chaos is a 2012 stream of consciousness art and browser game created by Winter Lake.

Development
While learning the software Twine, author Winter Lake made the game "in a couple hours" on July 18, 2012. Originally, the game was available via Winter Lake's website monster killers. The game disappeared for a number of years with copies only available on saved hard drives. Rock, Paper, Shotgun contributor Robert Yang made it available again on his personal website.

Plot
A spaceship captain chooses between going about their daily routine or "unleashing rat chaos."

Reception 

In 2012, IndieGames.coms Konstantinos Dimopoulos described Rat Chaos as "weird, sports a really odd use of the English language, will make you both laugh and wonder, features some interesting drawings and was created with Twine." Free Indie Gamess Porpentine said it was "the funniest Twine game I’ve ever played, and the most human." Interactive fiction (IF) writer Emily Short critiqued it as "a very short Twine piece" that "plays with agency not in the usual ways [...] explores the idea of surface agency as a distraction."

In 2013, Rat Chaos character New Rat City won the XYZZY Award for Best Individual NPC in 2012. Jenni Polodna reviewed the character: "New Rat City is a personal statement. New Rat City is a tuning fork for all of our weird-kid mitochondria, which, if you squint, might or might not be covered in little rat faces trying to look normal.  This might or might not be how you were able to unleash all that rat chaos." Comics & Gaming Magazines Reid McCarter called it "a surrealist adventure."

In 2015, Gamasutra published a preview excerpt chapter, "Rat Chaos by Winter Lake", from the Merritt k-edited book Videogames for Humans. In Videogames for Humans, Rat Chaos was praised by one contributor: "I couldn’t have asked for a better or more meaningful or more personally resonant piece to introduce me to Twine than Winter Lake’s Rat Chaos."

In 2016, Rock, Paper, Shotgun staff ranked it 47th on their list "The 50 Best Free Games On PC" saying "[it's] as odd as a Twine game can get and just as funny, playing with language and mistyping in a way that evokes the weirdest of Weird Twitter."

References

External links 

2010s interactive fiction
2012 video games
Art games
Browser games
Internet properties established in 2012
Metafictional video games
Science fiction video games
Twine games
Video games about mice and rats
Video games developed in the United States
Video games set in outer space
Video games set on fictional planets